Stephanie Theodore (born 30 September 1970, in France) is an Australian former cricket player. She played domestic cricket for the Victorian state women's cricket team between 1991 and 2002. Theodore played one Test and one One Day International for the Australia national women's cricket team.

References

External links
 Stephanie Theodore at CricketArchive
 Stephanie Theodore at southernstars.org.au

Living people
Australia women Test cricketers
Australia women One Day International cricketers
People educated at Carey Baptist Grammar School
1970 births